is a Japanese female karateka and mixed martial arts (MMA) fighter. Kaneko has competed for MMA promotions Ax, Smackgirl, Deep and Jewels.

Background

Martial arts training
In 1999, Kaneko won the All-Japan Amateur Shooto Championships in the women's flyweight and also the bantamweight divisions of East Japan. In 2000, she conquered the Central Japan Amateur Shooto Championships in the featherweight division.

In 1999 Kaneko was the runner-up in the Real Fighting Karate-do Championships, repeating this feat in 2000.

From 2001 to 2003 she won the Real Fighting Karate-do Championships and was the runner up in 2004.

In 2009 and 2010 Kaneko was the runner up of the All-Japan Real Fighting Karate Championships -52 kg, being defeated in the final both times by Saori Ishioka.

Mixed martial arts career

At Smackgirl: Burning Night on  Kaneko defeated Mika Harigai with an armbar submission in the first round.

On , Kaneko was knocked out with knees in the first round by at the time debutant Izumi Noguchi at Ax Vol. 2: we want to shine.

On  at Smackgirl: Summer Gate 2002 Kaneko defeated kickboxer Hisae Watanabe by armbar submission in the second round.

At Smackgirl: Japan Cup 2002 Episode 2 on  during the semi-finals of the middleweight tournament, Kaneko was able to avenge her previous defeat at the hands of Tomomi Sunaba, defeating Sunaba this time by unanimous decision and advancing to the final.

On  at Smackgirl: Japan Cup 2002 Grand Final, Kaneko faced MMA star Yuka Tsuji, who defeated Kaneko by unanimous decision in the final of the middleweight tournament.

On , Kaneko participated in the event  where she defeated Asami Kodera via submission (rear naked choke) in the first round of the tournament, actress, pro-wrestler and race queen Mizuho Ishikawa via submission (armbar) in the semi-finals before finally losing the final against Hisae Watanabe, whom Kaneko had defeated in 2002, via unanimous decision.

This was also Kaneko retirement match from MMA.

MMA tag matches

Mixed martial arts record

|-
| Win
| align=center| 10-8-1
| Rina Tomita
| Decision (3-0)
| Jewels 6th Ring
| 
| align=center| 2
| align=center| 5:00
| Kabukicho, Tokyo, Japan
| 
|-
| Loss
| align=center| 9-8-1
| Satoko Shinashi
| Decision (0-3)
| Deep: 19th Impact
| 
| align=center| 2
| align=center| 5:00
| Bunkyo, Tokyo, Japan
| 
|-
| Draw
| align=center| 9-7-1
| Satoko Shinashi
| Draw
| Deep: 18th Impact
| 
| align=center| 2
| align=center| 5:00
| Bunkyo, Tokyo|Bunkyo, Tokyo, Japan
| 
|-
| Loss
| align=center| 9-7-0
| Hisae Watanabe
| Decision (0-3)
| Golden Muscle Women's MMA: Strongest Queen Tournament
| 
| align=center| 2
| align=center| 3:00
| Koto, Tokyo, Japan
| 
|-
| Win
| align=center| 9-6-0
| Mizuho Ishikawa
| Submission (armbar)
| Golden Muscle Women's MMA: Strongest Queen Tournament
| 
| align=center| 1
| align=center| 0:47
| Koto, Tokyo|Koto, Tokyo, Japan
| 
|-
| Win
| align=center| 8-6-0
| Asami Kodera
| Submission (rear naked choke)
| Golden Muscle Women's MMA: Strongest Queen Tournament
| 
| align=center| 1
| align=center| 1:17
| Koto, Tokyo|Koto, Tokyo, Japan
| 
|-
| Loss
| align=center| 7-6-0
| Izumi Noguchi
| Decision (0-3)
| Smackgirl: Third Season V
| 
| align=center| 3
| align=center| 5:00
| Minato, Tokyo, Japan
| 
|-
| Win
| align=center| 7-5-0
| Keiko Matsukawa
| Submission (armbar)
| Arkadia
| 
| align=center| 1
| align=center| 2:21
| Hakuba, Nagano Prefecture, Japan
| 
|-
| Loss
| align=center| 6-5-0
| Yuka Tsuji
| Decision (0-3)
| Smackgirl: Japan Cup 2002 Grand Final
| 
| align=center| 3
| align=center| 5:00
| Chiyoda, Tokyo, Japan
| 
|-
| Win
| align=center| 6-4-0
| Tomomi Sunaba
| Decision (3-0)
| Smackgirl: Japan Cup 2002 Episode 2
| 
| align=center| 3
| align=center| 5:00
| Koto, Tokyo|Koto, Tokyo, Japan
| 
|-
| Win
| align=center| 5-4-0
| Aya Koyama
| Decision (3-0)
| Smackgirl: Japan Cup 2002 Opening Round
| 
| align=center| 3
| align=center| 5:00
| Koto, Tokyo|Koto, Tokyo, Japan
| 
|-
| Win
| align=center| 4-4-0
| Hisae Watanabe
| Submission (armbar)
| Smackgirl: Summer Gate 2002
| 
| align=center| 2
| align=center| 3:54
| Koto, Tokyo|Koto, Tokyo, Japan
| 
|-
| Loss
| align=center| 3-4-0
| Tomomi Sunaba
| Decision (1-2)
| Smackgirl: Golden Gate 2002
| 
| align=center| 3
| align=center| 5:00
| Koto, Tokyo|Koto, Tokyo, Japan
| 
|-
| Win
| align=center| 3-3-0
| Naoko Torashima
| Submission (armbar)
| Smackgirl: God Bless You
| 
| align=center| 1
| align=center| 2:15
| Koto, Tokyo|Koto, Tokyo, Japan
| 
|-
| Loss
| align=center| 2-3-0
| Izumi Noguchi
| KO (knees)
| Ax Vol. 2: we want to shine
| 
| align=center| 1
| align=center| 1:25
| Minato, Tokyo|Minato, Tokyo, Japan
| 
|-
| Win
| align=center| 2-2-0
| Mika Harigai
| Submission (armbar)
| Smackgirl: Burning Night
| 
| align=center| 1
| align=center| 4:05
| Shibuya, Tokyo, Japan
| 
|-
| Loss
| align=center| 1-2-0
| Ikuma Hoshino
| Submission (guillotine choke)
| Smackgirl: Indeed,
| 
| align=center| 3
| align=center| 1:50
| Shibuya, Tokyo|Shibuya, Tokyo, Japan
| 
|-
| Win
| align=center| 1-1-0
| Miwako Ishihara
| Submission (armbar)
| Smackgirl: Episode 0
| 
| align=center| 1
| align=center| 0:36
| Bunkyo, Tokyo|Bunkyo, Tokyo, Japan
| 
|-
| Loss
| align=center| 0-1-0
| Yoko Takahashi
| Submission (achilles lock)
| Club Fight Round 1
| 
| align=center| 1
| align=center| 4:01
| Shibuya, Tokyo|Shibuya, Tokyo, Japan
|

Championships and accomplishments

Karate
All-Japan RF Karate Championships 1999 runner-up
All-Japan RF Karate Championships 2000 runner-up
All-Japan RF Karate Championships 2001 winner
All-Japan RF Karate Championships 2002 winner
All-Japan RF Karate Championships -50 kg 2003 winner
All-Japan RF Karate Championships -50 kg 2004 runner-up
All-Japan RF Karate Championships -52 kg 2009 runner-up
All-Japan RF Karate Championships -52 kg 2010 runner-up

Mixed martial arts
All-Japan Amateur Shooto Championships women's flyweight 1999 winner
Smackgirl Japan Cup 2002 middleweight runner-up
Strongest Queen Tournament 2004 runner-up

See also
List of female mixed martial artists

References

External links
 Mari Kaneko Awakening Profile

Profile at Fightergirls.com
Profile at Deep 

1972 births
Living people
Flyweight mixed martial artists
Japanese female mixed martial artists
Mixed martial artists utilizing karate
Japanese female karateka
Sportspeople from Nagano Prefecture